Camille Bert (1880–1970) was a French actor.

Born Camille Léon Louis Bertrand in Orléans, he died in Paris in 1970.

Selected filmography
 Le secret de Rosette Lambert (1920)
 The Thruster (1924)
 The Lady of Lebanon (1926)
 The Temple of Shadows (1927)
 Yasmina (1927)
 The Crew (1928)
 Tarakanova (1930)
 Accused, Stand Up! (1930)
 David Golder (1931)
 Maurin of the Moors (1932)
 The Little King (1933)
 The Two Orphans (1933)
 Sapho (1934)
 Tovaritch (1935)
 Michel Strogoff (1936)
 The Tender Enemy (1936)
 The Lower Depths (1936)
 Yoshiwara (1937)
 Thérèse Martin (1939)
 Miss Bonaparte (1942)
 The Blue Veil (1942)
 The Midnight Sun (1943)
 Special Mission (1946)
 The Fan (1947)

Bibliography
 Oscherwitz, Dayna & Higgins, MaryEllen. The A to Z of French Cinema. Scarecrow Press, 2009.
 Powrie, Phil & Rebillard, Éric. Pierre Batcheff and stardom in 1920s French cinema. Edinburgh University Press, 2009

External links

1880 births
1970 deaths
French male film actors
French male silent film actors
Actors from Orléans
20th-century French male actors